Santa Catarina Mita is a town, with a population of 14,520 (2018 census), and a municipality in the Jutiapa department of Guatemala. The municipality cover an area of 207 km2 and has a population of 28,983 (2018 census).

References

External links 
 Directorio Comercial de Santa Catarina Mita
 Guía Turistica y Empresarial de Santa Catarina Mita
 Asociación de Catarinecos Residentes en USA

Municipalities of the Jutiapa Department